Cristian Dzwonik (born 18 March 1971 in Buenos Aires), better known by his pseudonym Nik, is a cartoonist from Argentina, creator of Gaturro, and current cartoonist in the paper La Nación. He received the 2002 Konex Platinum Award for Best cartoonist, and four times the prize SIP (Sociedad Interamericana de Prensa). His works have been published throughout Latin America, the United States, Spain and France.

Nik has been accused multiple times of plagiarising works from other cartoonists/artists, and there is strong evidence of his plagiarism of the works of cartoonists Quino, Caloi, Fontanarrosa, and Claudio Kappel among others.

References

External links 
 Nik's website
 
 Gaturro at iGoogle
 Gaturro's World

Argentine cartoonists
Living people
1971 births